Rashid Imamovich Sharafetdinov (10 July 1943 – 21 November 2012) was a Russian long-distance runner who competed in the 1968 Summer Olympics and in the 1972 Summer Olympics.

References

1943 births
2012 deaths
Russian male long-distance runners
Soviet male long-distance runners
Olympic athletes of the Soviet Union
Athletes (track and field) at the 1968 Summer Olympics
Athletes (track and field) at the 1972 Summer Olympics
European Athletics Championships medalists
Universiade medalists in athletics (track and field)
Universiade gold medalists for the Soviet Union
Medalists at the 1970 Summer Universiade
Herzen University alumni